Joseph Walker Carroll (born May 29, 1950) is a former American football linebacker. He played for the Oakland Raiders in 1972-1973.

References

1950 births
Living people
American football linebackers
Pittsburgh Panthers football players
Oakland Raiders players